The State Register of Heritage Places is maintained by the Heritage Council of Western Australia. , 111 places are heritage-listed in the Shire of Carnarvon, of which 13 are on the State Register of Heritage Places.

List
The Western Australian State Register of Heritage Places, lists the following 13 state registered places within the Shire of Carnarvon:

Former places
The following place has been removed from the State Register of Heritage Places within the Shire of Carnarvon:

References

Carnarvon
 
Carnarvon